Sarah Roberts (born 4 December 1984) is an Australian television and film actress. After training at the 16th Street Actors Studio, Roberts took part in the 2012 reality television series Bollywood Star, in which Australians compete for a chance to work with Bollywood director Mahesh Bhatt. She has made guest appearances in various Australian television shows, including Jack Irish and INXS: Never Tear Us Apart. After appearing in the 2014 Neighbours spin-off series Brennan on the Run as Sienna Matthews, Roberts joined the cast of the main show in a recurring capacity. From 2017 to 2021, she played Willow Harris in Home and Away. Roberts has also starred in the feature films Felony and UnIndian.

Early life
Roberts is of Sri Lankan heritage. After graduating from high school, Roberts moved to China to teach English. She then moved to Tokyo when she was 18 and secured the role of Princess Jasmine at the Tokyo Disneyland production of Aladdin. Three years later, Roberts returned to Australia. She trained at the 16th Street Actors Studio in Melbourne.

Career
Roberts was a contestant on the 2012 SBS reality television series Bollywood Star, in which Australians competed for the chance to appear in a Bollywood film by director Mahesh Bhatt. She made it to the top four. Shortly after the show finished, Roberts auditioned for Matthew Saville's crime thriller Felony. Roberts attended three auditions in total, and after the final one in Sydney, she was convinced that she would not receive the role. Two weeks later, Roberts was informed that she had been cast as Ankhila, the mother of a young boy who is killed in a hit and run. Felony was written by Joel Edgerton, who also stars in the lead role, and it premiered at the 2013 Toronto Film Festival.

Roberts was also cast in a production of Alan Ball's play All That I Will Ever Be by director Robert Chuter in 2012. She portrayed the two female roles of Cynthia and Beth. Roberts has had guest stints in several Australian television shows and films, including It's a Date, Angry Boys and Wolf Creek 2. She also appears in the Jack Irish television film series, and the INXS: Never Tear Us Apart miniseries.

In 2014, Roberts appeared in the Neighbours web series Brennan on the Run as Sienna Matthews, the girlfriend of Mark Brennan (Scott McGregor), a former police detective in witness protection. Later that year, Roberts reprised her role of Sienna and joined the cast of Neighbours in a recurring capacity. Roberts received hate mail during her time in the show, as viewers did not like her character. She had previously made one off guest appearances in Neighbours during 2010 and 2011.

In late 2014, Roberts was cast in the romantic comedy UnIndian. It was the first feature film from the Australia India Film Fund established the previous year. Roberts stars alongside Tannishtha Chatterjee and former cricketer Brett Lee. Roberts joined the cast of Home and Away in 2017 as Willow Harris. She flew up from Melbourne to Sydney for the audition, where she had a chemistry reading with actor James Stewart, who plays Justin Morgan. She had originally auditioned for the roles of Kat Chapman and Scarlett Snow. Roberts described Willow as "a tough, dynamic and powerful character". In March 2021, Roberts confirmed that she had quit Home and Away and was auditioning for new roles. Her final scenes aired on 14 April 2021. In 2022, Roberts will appear in the comedy film Wog Boys Forever, written by Nick Giannopoulos.

Personal life
In addition to her acting career, Roberts is also a DJ and plays with singer Kate Greer in a duo called VAMP. Their first single "Neon Lights" features rapper Eve.

Roberts has been in a relationship with her Home and Away co-star James Stewart since October 2017. They announced their engagement in December 2018, and married at Luttrellstown Castle in Ireland in July 2019. Roberts is stepmother to Stewart's daughter Scout from his relationship with Jessica Marais.

On 23 October 2019, Roberts' brother Karl died of brain cancer.

Filmography

Film

Television

References

External links

Australian people of Sri Lankan descent
Australian soap opera actresses
Australian film actresses
Australian DJs
Actresses from Melbourne
21st-century Australian actresses
Living people
1984 births